Koverninsky District is an administrative district (raion), one of the forty in Nizhny Novgorod Oblast, Russia. Municipally, it is incorporated as Koverninsky Municipal District. It is located in the northwest of the oblast. Its administrative center is the urban locality (a work settlement) of Kovernino. As of the 2010 Census, the total population of the district was 19,951, with the population of Kovernino accounting for 34.5% of that number.

History
The district was established in 1929.

References

Notes

Sources

Districts of Nizhny Novgorod Oblast
States and territories established in 1929
 
